Imputed righteousness is a concept in Christian theology proposing that the "righteousness of Christ ... is imputed to [believers] — that is, treated as if it were theirs through faith." It is on the basis of Jesus' righteousness that God accepts humans. This acceptance is also referred to as justification.

The teaching of imputed righteousness is a signature doctrine of the Lutheran and Reformed traditions of Christianity. There is some dispute as to the origin of the reformation era concept of imputed righteousness. Some modern Lutherans deny that Luther taught it before other reformers such as Melancthon. However, Luther did use the term in this sense as early as 1516. In his seminal 1516 Novum Instrumentum omne (actually finished late in 1515 but printed in March 1516), Erasmus rendered the Greek logizomai (reckon) as "imputat" all eleven times it appears in Romans chapter four. The Vulgate Erasmus intended to "correct" usually rendered it "reputat" (repute). Erasmus was at this time famous and Luther almost unknown, leaving open the possibility that the concept itself did not originate from Luther, but rather, if not from Erasmus, then within the wider church reform movement.

Imputed, infused and imparted righteousness 

Discussion of these concepts are complicated by different definitions of key terms, such as "justification" and "grace".

Imputed righteousness is the righteousness of Jesus credited to the Christian, enabling the Christian to be justified. Double imputation refers to the imputation of believers' sin to Christ and the imputation of Christ's righteousness to believers. It is closely related to the Reformed doctrine of justification by grace through faith alone. Passages like 2 Corinthians 5:21, are employed to argue for a dual imputation – the imputation of one's sin to Christ and then of his righteousness to believers in him.

Infused righteousness, by contrast, can be described as: "In Augustine's view, God bestows justifying righteousness upon the sinner in such a way that it becomes part of his or her person."

Imparted righteousness, in Methodist theology, is what God does in Christ by the power of the Holy Spirit after justification, working in the Christian to enable and empower the process of sanctification (and, in Wesleyan thought, Christian perfection). John Wesley believed that imparted righteousness worked in tandem with imputed righteousness.

Starting with Augustine, the Roman Catholic tradition has understood justification as the entire process by which God forgives and then transforms Christians. Based on their reading of the use of "justification" in Paul's letters, the Reformers took justification to refer specifically to God's forgiveness and acceptance. The term "sanctification" was used to refer to the lifelong process of transformation. Thus the Roman Catholic term "justification" effectively includes both what Protestants refer to as "justification" and "sanctification." This difference in definitions can result in confusion, effectively exaggerating the disagreement. However the difference in definitions reflects a difference in substance. In the Protestant concept, justification is a status before God that is entirely the result of God's activity and that continues even when humans sin. Thus using different words for justification and sanctification reflects a distinction between aspects of salvation that are entirely the result of God's activity, and those that involve human cooperation. The Roman Catholic tradition uses a single term, in part, because it does not recognize a distinction of this type. For the Roman Catholic tradition, while everything originates with God, the entire process of justification requires human cooperation, and serious sin compromises it.

Imputed vs. infused
Both imputed and infused righteousness agree that God is the source of our righteousness, and that it is a gift that humans cannot deserve. Both models agree that God's activity results in humans being transformed, so that over time they become more obedient to God, and sin is progressively defeated in their lives.

The distinction includes at least two areas:

 1 How justification is maintained, and the effect of sin
According to imputed righteousness, the righteousness by which humans are made acceptable to God, remains "alien." Since their acceptability is based on God's actions, nothing humans do can forfeit their status as accepted. Sin can result in God treating them as disobedient, but not in God disowning them.

Protestants differ on the question of whether it is possible for humans to forfeit justification. But if they do, it is by ceasing to have faith in God, not by any individual sin.

Roman Catholics hold that righteousness comes to be present in humans, and that the continuing status of acceptance is based on this. Humans have a responsibility to cooperate with God in maintaining and strengthening the presence of this "grace" in their lives. Certain serious sins (called "mortal sins") can result in its loss.

Thus in the case of serious sins, Protestants believe that they continue to be treated as God's children, but as disobedient ones that require discipline, while Roman Catholics believe that the bond with God is largely severed, and restoring it requires "a new initiative of God's mercy and a conversion of heart normally accomplished within the setting of the sacrament of reconciliation" 

 2 Merit
Protestants have avoided speaking of humans as having any "merit" before God. Because all justifying righteousness is alien, humans do not deserve anything good from God. Because Roman Catholics hold that righteousness comes to be present in humans, humans can in a certain sense merit reward. Of course any such merit is ultimately due to God's activity.

Protestants and Roman Catholics agree that non-Christians can do things that are worthwhile. They do not merit salvation, but some Protestant writers have spoken of them as reflecting "civil righteousness."  

While there are significant differences between imputed and infused righteousness, they can be regarded to a certain extent as differences in emphasis that are potentially complementary. Imputed righteousness emphasizes that salvation is a gift from God and is dependent upon him, while infused righteousness emphasizes the responsibility of humans to cooperate with God's actions in transforming their lives. The position that they are potentially complementary is taken by a joint declaration of the Lutheran World Federation and the Roman Catholic Church.

Enough differences remain, however, both in doctrine and in practical consequences, that not everyone agrees that the two views can be regarded as complementary.

What is meant by righteousness? 

The concepts here are nominally derived from the letters of Paul the Apostle (particularly the Epistle to the Romans), which form a large part of the Christian New Testament.

However the concepts have been filtered through the concerns of later Christian theology. From at least the time of Augustine of Hippo in the 5th Century, "righteousness" has been seen as a moral and religious quality. In the Roman Catholic model, Christians are transformed by God's action, developing a righteousness of their own. In the 16th Century, the Protestant Reformers came to understand human acceptance by God according to a "forensic" model, in which God declares humanity not guilty, even though they were in a moral sense still guilty of sin. However, the Reformers continued to accept the traditional concept of righteousness. What changed is that the righteousness was seen as Christ's, which was credited ("imputed") to Christians by God.

Starting in the middle of the 20th Century, increased knowledge of first Century Judaism has produced a reassessment of many of the concepts with which Paul was working. Many scholars now see "righteousness" as a Hebrew concept referring to fidelity to God's covenant with humanity (for God) or the status of being a proper member of that covenant (for a human). If this is correct, then righteousness is a status, not a quality of religious/moral perfection.

The case against both imputed and imparted righteousness 

This section is a precis of N. T. Wright's work in "What Saint Paul Really Said".

Wright, one of the best-known advocates of the New Perspective on Paul, teaches that "righteousness of God" and "righteousness from God" are distinct concepts that have been confused and conflated in the past. He relates the court-room metaphor, pointing out that there are three parties in the Hebrew court - two parties in disagreement and one judge (there is no "Prosecuting Attorney"). The judge decides the dispute between the parties declaring one to be correct and the other incorrect. The one who is declared "correct" in court is called "righteous" in the matter that was judged.

The "righteousness of God", referring to God's (the judge's) faithfulness to the covenant relationship, can be neither imputed nor imparted to anybody but refers only to his role as judge.  "Righteousness from God" is roughly equivalent to "vindication", meaning that God is pronouncing that particular party to be correct/vindicated/righteous/acquitted in their dispute with the other party.  The dispute in question in Christian theology is between those of faith (in God's promises: the covenant, the Messiah), and "the wicked," meaning everyone else. Paul posited that the people of such faith are vindicated when Messiah returns, being declared "righteous" (or in other words, vindicated for their stance), which is exactly the meaning of the Biblical term "justified", in Wright's view.

This means that we do not "receive" the righteousness of God (or as often expressed, "of Jesus"), as in the classical Evangelical vernacular, nor is it "infused" as in the classical Roman Catholic vernacular. The "righteousness of God" remains His alone, and our "righteousness from God" means that we are found to be "of" the people of God. Paul's argument is that it has always been so, but what has changed is that the Messiah, in Jesus of Nazareth, has now appeared.

An important verse to note is 2 Cor 5:21, "For our sake he made him to be sin who knew no sin, so that in him we might become the righteousness of God" (ESV), which has traditionally been interpreted to mean that the Christian has, in some way, become righteous (by impartation or imputation), in exchange for Jesus' sinlessness. Moreover, Wright says, Paul is speaking here of the apostles, and pointing out that in their role as apostles, their activity is effectively God's righteousness (covenant faithfulness) in action ("we are ambassadors for Christ, God making his appeal through us. We implore you on behalf of Christ, be reconciled to God" - v 20). This meaning is natural when taken in context from verse 11 through 21.

The case for imputed righteousness 

Imputed righteousness is the Protestant Christian doctrine that a sinner is declared righteous by God purely by God's grace through faith in Christ, and thus all depends on Christ's merit and worthiness, rather than on one's own merit and worthiness.  On the one hand,  God is infinitely merciful, "not wishing for any to perish, but for all to come to repentance." (2 Peter 3:9) ----- though this passage is often interpreted by many Protestants as referring only to Christians, as the context of the epistle indicates that Peter's audience were believers, and the first half of the verse indicates that the promises of God to believers are not late but patiently enduring the unfolding of history as God sovereignly saves His own through time.  On the other, God is infinitely holy and just, which means that he cannot approve of or even look upon evil (Habakkuk 1:13), neither can he justify a wicked person (Book of Proverbs 17:15).  Because the Bible describes all men as sinners and says that there are none who are righteous (Epistle to the Romans 3:23, 10) this is a classic theological tension. To use the words of St Paul, how can God be "just and the justifier of those who believe (Rom. 3:26)?"  Through this argument, God cannot ignore or in any way overlook sin.

Adherents say that God the Father resolves this problem by sending Christ, who is sinless and indestructibly perfect in character, to lead a perfect life and sacrifice himself for the sins of mankind.  The sins of the repentant sinner are cast onto Christ, who is a perfect sacrifice. First of all, they note that the New Testament describes the method of man's salvation as the "righteousness of God" (Rom. 3:21, 22; 10:3; Philippians 3:9).  They then note that this imputed righteousness is particularly that of Jesus Christ (2 Corinthians 5:21; 1 Corinthians 1:30).  When they refer to the "imputed righteousness of Christ," they are referring to his intrinsic character as well as his life of sinlessness and perfect obedience to God's law on Earth, usually called his active obedience.  The need for a human life of perfect obedience to God's law was the reason that Christ, who is God, had to become incarnate (take on human flesh) and live as a human being.  Paul's statement in Romans 4:6, that God "imputes righteousness apart from works," is the basis for the fourth step in the argument that this righteousness of Christ is imputed to the believer's account.  By this terminology, they mean that God legally credits the believer with the righteous acts that Christ performed while on this earth.  Luther uses the language of a "fortunate exchange" to describe this concept, borrowed from St Paul's imagery in Colossians 3.  Christ trades his "garments," holiness, righteousness, being blessed by God the Father, in exchange for human sin.  This is really good news for sinners - Christ takes their sin and believers receive His blessed condition and righteousness.

This righteousness of Christ and its relationship to the recipient can also be likened to adoption.  Adoption legally constitutes a child the son or daughter of a person that is not that child's birth parent.  Similarly, in marriage the married partners are considered one entity legally. Sinner who believes in Christ are spiritually united with Christ, and that union makes it possible for God to credit believers with the righteousness of Christ without engaging in "legal fiction."

Arguments against the doctrine of imputed righteousness 
Many Christians, most notably of the Catholic and Holiness traditions, believe that when God declares someone righteous in Christ he actually makes that person righteous. This, therefore, means that someone is now infused with the righteousness of Christ. Christ's righteousness is a present reality, but it also in the form of that person's own righteousness.

Catholics contend that the final interpretation of scripture falls to the historical Catholic Church (collectively known as the Magisterium); in particular the opinions of the early Church Fathers - many of whom held opinions on justification before the closure of the Christian Canon. Therefore, the more recent Protestant understandings of the Greek word δικαιοο is not only seen to be in error lexically, but also historically.

A major objection to imputed righteousness is that it appears to be a means of acquitting the guilty rather than pardoning the guilty. (Scripture denies the possibility of acquitting the guilty in Exodus 23:7 and Deuteronomy 25:1.) The Greek word δικαιοο, usually translated "justify," may be understood in another sense: "to do justice" "to have justice done" (Thayer's Lexicon) or "to satisfy justice."   The 1968 Supplement of Liddell Scott and Jones also includes the definition, "brought to justice"; This sense is the normative definition found in Hellenistic Greek meaning "to punish" or "administer justice (to someone)."  Instead of meaning declared righteous or made righteous, the term may mean the proper or legally approved punishment has been administered. Understood this way, the objectionable idea of acquitting the guilty in the term "justify" is avoided.

The Protestant doctrine of imputed righteousness is also opposed by the doctrine of The New Church, as explained by Emanuel Swedenborg, and is thus closely aligned with the Roman Catholic tradition.  The "imputation" of the Lord's merit is nothing but the remission of sins after repentance.  According to Swedenborg, "Mention is often made in the Word of "the righteous," of "righteousness," and of "to be made righteous;" but what is specifically signified by these expressions is not yet known.  ...It is believed by the heads of the church that he is righteous, and has been made righteous, who is acquainted with the truths of faith from the doctrine of the church and from the Word, and consequently is in the trust and confidence that he is saved through the Lord's righteousness, and that the Lord has acquired righteousness by fulfilling all things of the Law, and that He acquired merit because He endured the cross, and thereby made atonement for and redeemed man. Through this faith alone a man is believed to be made righteous; and it is believed further that such are they who are called in the Word "the righteous."  Yet it is not these who are called "righteous" in the Word; but those who from the Lord are in the good of charity toward the neighbor; for the Lord alone is righteous, because He alone is righteousness. Therefore, a man is righteous, and has been made righteous, insofar as he receives good from the Lord, that is, insofar, and according to the way, in which he has in him what belongs to the Lord. The Lord was made righteousness through His having by His own power made His Human Divine. This Divine, with the man who receives it, is the Lord's righteousness with him, and is the very good of charity toward the neighbor; for the Lord is in the good of love, and through it in the truth of faith, because the Lord is Divine love itself."

Differing views about imputed righteousness

Roman Catholic view 
"The Catholic idea maintains that the formal cause of justification does not consist in an exterior imputation of the justice of Christ, but in a real, interior sanctification effected by grace, which abounds in the soul and makes it permanently holy before God. Although the sinner is justified by the justice of Christ, inasmuch as the Redeemer has merited for him or her the grace of justification (causa meritoria), nevertheless he or she is formally justified and made holy by his or her own personal justice and holiness (causa formalis)." Although internal and proper to the one justified, this justice and holiness are still understood as a gift of grace through the Holy Spirit rather than something earned or acquired independently of God's salvific work.  Put starkly, the Roman Catholic Church rejects the teaching of imputed righteousness as being a present reality.  This is at the very center of the disagreements between Roman Catholics and Lutherans, and remains the primary sticking point to a unification of these traditions to this day.

Lutheran view 
Philipp Melanchthon, a contemporary of Martin Luther, stressed the classic Lutheran desire to distinguish carefully and properly between Law and Gospel. In doing so he emphasized that Law binds, convicts, and drives people, while the Gospel proclaims repentance, the promise of grace, eternal life, and proclaims their liberty in Christ.

Reformed view 
The Reformed and Presbyterian churches have generally followed the Lutherans on the importance of distinguishing the law and the gospel. Articulated in terms of Covenant Theology, law and gospel have been associated with the Covenant of Law (Mosaic, not to be confused with Covenant of Works, Adamic) and the Covenant of Grace, respectively. Historically, they have been more open to the broader biblical language the Lutheran Formula of Concord calls "correct" but not "proper." Recently, some prominent theologians have disputed the centrality of the law-gospel distinction in the Reformed tradition.

See also

 Imparted righteousness
 Original sin
 Righteousness
 Salvation

References

Further reading

External links
 Biblical Judgments and Theological Concepts: Toward a Defense of Imputed Righteousness, by Jordan P. Barrett, Scottish Bulletin of Evangelical Theology 32, 2014. 
 Exegesis of 2 Corinthians 5:14-6:2 by B.J. Tackmier, Wisconsin Lutheran Quarterly, Vol. 110, No 4, 2013
 Dozens of resources on the imputation of Christ's righteousness from a Reformed perspective Monergism.com
 Audio series overview of the Reformed faith and its doctrine of Justification by Imputed Righteousness
 Lutheran perspective of imputed righteousness
Opposing views:
 Dikaiosyne Theou: The Righteousness of God in Contemporary Biblical Scholarship
 Exposing the Errors of Imputed Righteousness: by Mike Desario
 Discussion of the Catholic doctrine of infused righteousness by Jimmy Akin
 Correcting the Errors of Imputed Righteousness

Lutheran theology
Calvinist theology
Salvation in Protestantism
Christian terminology